The Garibaldi Towers are two high-rise buildings in Milan. They are next to Porta Garibaldi railway station.
They were built between 1984 and 1992 by the Italian state railways Ferrovie dello Stato to house its offices. 
The buildings are 100 meters tall with 25 floors.

See also
Porta Nuova (Milan)
Centro Direzionale di Milano
List of tallest buildings in Milan

References

Skyscrapers in Milan